Mount Arjuno-Welirang is a stratovolcano in the province of East Java on Java, Indonesia. Mount Arjuno-Welirang lies about 50 kilometers (31 mi) south of Surabaya, and 20 kilometers (12 mi) north of Malang. It is a twin volcano, with the 'twins' being Arjuno and Welirang. There is at least one other stratovolcano in the area, and there are around 10 pyroclastic cones nearby. They are located in a 6 km line between Arjuno and Welirang. The Arjuno-Welirang volcanic complex itself lies in the older two volcanoes, Mount Ringgit to the east and Mount Linting to the south. The summit lacks vegetation. Fumarolic areas with sulfur deposits are found in several locations on Welirang.

The name Arjuno is Javanese rendition of Arjuna, a hero in Mahabharata epic, while Welirang is Javanese word for sulfur.

A 1950 eruption had a VEI=2. There was an explosive eruption. Another eruption occurred two years later in 1952. This eruption had a VEI=0.

A 300 hectares at slope of Mount Arjuno near the road of Surabaya-Malang is used by Taman Safari II.

Gallery

See also 

 List of volcanoes in Indonesia

References 

Active volcanoes of Indonesia
Stratovolcanoes of Indonesia
Volcanoes of East Java
Mountains of East Java
Biosphere reserves of Indonesia
Holocene stratovolcanoes